A prince-bishop is a bishop who is also the civil ruler of some secular principality and sovereignty, as opposed to Prince of the Church itself, a title associated with cardinals. Since 1951, the sole extant prince-bishop has been the Bishop of Urgell, Catalonia, who has remained ex officio one of two co-princes of Andorra, along with the French president.

Overview
In the West, with the decline of imperial power from the 4th century onwards in the face of the barbarian invasions, sometimes Christian bishops of cities took the place of the Roman commander, made secular decisions for the city and led their own troops when necessary. Later relations between a prince-bishop and the burghers were invariably not cordial. As cities demanded charters from emperors, kings, or their prince-bishops and declared themselves independent of the secular territorial magnates, friction intensified between burghers and bishops. The principality or prince-bishopric (Hochstift) ruled politically by a prince-bishop could wholly or largely have overlapped with his diocesan jurisdiction, but some parts of his diocese, even the city of his residence, could have been exempt from his civil rule, obtaining the status of free imperial city. If the episcopal see was an archbishopric, the correct term was prince-archbishop; the equivalent in the regular (monastic) clergy was prince-abbot. A prince-bishop was usually considered an elected monarch. With the dissolution of the Holy Roman Empire in 1806, the title finally became defunct in the Confederation of the Rhine. However, in respect to the lands of the former Holy Roman Empire outside of French control, such as the Habsburg Monarchy, including Austria proper (Salzburg, Seckau), the Lands of the Bohemian Crown (the bulk of Olomouc and parts of Breslau), as well as in respect to the parts of the 1795-partitioned Polish state, including those forming part of the Kingdom of Galicia and Lodomeria or those acquired by the Kingdom of Prussia, the position continued in some cases nominally and was sometimes transformed into a new, titular type, initially recognized by the German Empire and Austria-Hungary until their demise, with the title ultimately abolished altogether by the pope in 1951.

The sole exception is the Bishop of Urgell, Catalonia, who no longer has any secular rights in Spain, but remains ex officio one of two co-princes of Andorra, along with the French head of state (currently its President), and thus the last extant prince-bishop.

In the Byzantine Empire, the still autocratic Emperors passed general legal measures assigning all bishops certain rights and duties in the secular administration of their dioceses, possibly as part of a development to put the Eastern Church in the service of the Empire, with its Ecumenical Patriarch almost reduced to the Emperor's minister of religious affairs.. The institution of prince-bishop was revived in the Orthodox Church in the modern times during the existence of the Prince-Bishopric of Montenegro.

History

Holy Roman Empire 

Bishops had been involved in the government of the Frankish realm and subsequent Carolingian Empire frequently as the clerical member of a duo of envoys styled , but that was an individual mandate, not attached to the see. Prince-bishoprics were most common in the feudally fragmented Holy Roman Empire, where many were formally awarded the rank of an Imperial Prince , granting them the immediate power over a certain territory and a representation in the Imperial Diet.

The stem duchies of the German Kingdom inside the Empire had strong and powerful dukes (originally, war-rulers), always looking out more for their duchy's "national interest" than for the Empire's. In turn the first Ottonian (Saxon) king Henry the Fowler and more so his son, Emperor Otto I, intended to weaken the power of the dukes by granting loyal bishops Imperial lands and vest them with  privileges. Unlike dukes they could not pass hereditary titles and lands to any descendants. Instead the Emperors reserved the implementation of the bishops of their proprietary church for themselves, defying the fact that according to canon law they were part of the transnational Catholic Church. This met with increasing opposition by the Popes, culminating in the fierce Investiture Controversy of 1076. Nevertheless, the Emperors continued to grant major territories to the most important (arch)bishops. The immediate territory attached to the episcopal see then became a prince-diocese or (arch)bishopric. The German term  was often used to denote the form of secular authority held by bishops ruling a prince-bishopric with  being used for prince-archbishoprics.

Emperor Charles IV by the Golden Bull of 1356 confirmed the privileged status of the Prince-Archbishoprics of Mainz, Cologne and Trier as members of the electoral college. At the eve of the Protestant Reformation, the Imperial states comprised 53 ecclesiastical principalities. They were finally secularized in the 1803 German Mediatization upon the territorial losses to France in the Treaty of Lunéville, except for the Mainz prince-archbishop and German archchancellor Karl Theodor Anton Maria von Dalberg, who continued to rule as Prince of Aschaffenburg and Regensburg. With the dissolution of the Holy Roman Empire in 1806, the title finally became defunct in the successor Confederation of the Rhine.

The suffragan-bishoprics of Gurk (established 1070),  (1216),  (1218), and Lavant (1225) sometimes used the  title, but never held any  territory. However, all bishops' princely titles were abolished by the pope in 1951.

The Patriarchate of Aquileia (1077–1433) was conquered by Venice in 1420 and officially incorporated after the 1445 Council of Florence.

In Brescia Bishop Notingus was made count of Brescia in 844.

The archbishops of Besançon had been rulers in the Middle Ages over Besançon, an Imperial city from 1307, which in 1512 joined the Burgundian Circle. In the Bishopric of Belley, Saint Anthelm of Belley was granted  by Emperor Frederick I, but submitted temporal authorities to the Duchy of Savoy in 1401.

The Bishopric of Sion was from 999 a classic example of unified secular and diocesan authority. It progressively lost its powers since the Renaissance, and was finally replaced by the Republic of the Seven Tithings in 1634.

State of the Teutonic Order

Upon the incorporation of the Livonian Brothers of the Sword in 1237, the territory of the Order's State largely corresponded with the Diocese of Riga. Bishop Albert of Riga in 1207 had received the lands of Livonia as an Imperial fief from the hands of German king Philip of Swabia, he however had to come to terms with the Brothers of the Sword. At the behest of Pope Innocent III the Terra Mariana confederation was established, whereby Albert had to cede large parts of the episcopal territory to the Livonian Order. Albert proceeded tactically in the conflict between the Papacy and Emperor Frederick II: in 1225 he reached the acknowledgement of his status as a Prince-Bishop of the Empire, though the Roman Curia insisted on the fact that the Christianized Baltic territories were solely under the suverainty of the Holy See. By the 1234 Bull of Rieti, Pope Gregory IX stated that all lands acquired by the Teutonic Knights were no subject of any conveyancing by the Emperor.

Within this larger conflict, the continued dualism of the autonomous Riga prince-bishop and the Teutonic Knights led to a lengthy friction. Around 1245 the Papal legate William of Modena reached a compromise: though incorporated into the Order's State, the archdiocese and its suffragan bishoprics were acknowledged with their autonomous ecclesiastical territories by the Teutonic Knights. The bishops pursued the conferment of the princely title by the Holy Roman Emperor to stress their sovereignty. In the original Prussian lands of the Teutonic Order, Willam of Modena established the suffragan bishoprics of Culm, Pomesania, Samland and Warmia. From the late 13th century onwards, the appointed Warmia bishops were no longer members of the Teutonic Knights, a special status confirmed by the bestowal of the princely title by Emperor Charles IV in 1356.

Kingdom of Poland and Polish-Lithuanian Commonwealth 
Three bishoprics were initially parts of the Kingdom of Poland and its offshoots before being subsequently incorporated into the Holy Roman Empire, namely the bishoprics of Wolin/Kamień (Wollin/Cammin) (1140-1181), Lubusz (Lebus) (1125-1372) and Wrocław (Breslau) (1201-1335/1348), with the latter two of them continuing, however, as suffragan to the Polish archbishopric of Gniezno for many years later (until 1424 in the case of Lebus and until 1821 in the case of Breslau). On the other hand, the Prince Bishopric of Warmia was obtained by Poland following the Second Peace of Thorn.

England 
The Bishops of Durham were also territorial prince-bishops, with the extraordinary secular rank of earl palatine, for it was their duty not only to be head of the large diocese, but also to help protect the kingdom against the Scottish threat from the north. The title survived the union of England and Scotland into the Kingdom of Great Britain in 1707 until 1836. The first prince-bishop was William Walcher who purchased the earldom and constructed additional buildings of Durham Castle.

Except for a brief period of suppression during the English Civil War, the bishopric retained this temporal power until it was abolished by the Durham (County Palatine) Act 1836 with the powers returned to the Crown.

France 
From the tenth century civil wars on, many bishops took over the powers of the local count, as authorised by the king. For example, at Chalons-sur-Marne the bishop ruled the lands 20 km around the town, while the Archbishop of Rheims demarcated his territory with five fortresses of Courville, Cormicy, Betheneville, Sept-Saulx and Chaumuzy.
A number of French bishops did hold a noble title, with a tiny territory usually about their seat; it was often a princely title, especially Count. Indeed, six of the twelve original Pairies (the royal vassals awarded with the highest precedence at Court) were episcopal: the Archbishop of Reims, the Bishop of Langres, and the Bishop of Laon held a ducal title, the bishops of Beauvais, Chalôns, and Noyon had comital status. They were later joined by the Archbishop of Paris, who was awarded a ducal title, but with precedence over the others. France included a number of prince-bishops formerly within the Holy Roman Empire such those of Besançon, Cambrai, Strasbourg, Metz, Toul, Verdun, and Belley. The bishops of Arles, Embrun, and Grenoble also qualify as princes of episcopal cities. The bishop of Viviers was Count of Viviers and Prince de Donzère. The bishop of Sisteron was also Prince de Lurs, the title of count was held by the Archbishop of Lyons, and the bishop of Gap, Saint-Paul-Trois-Châteaux, Vienne and Die were Seigneurs of their cities. Never part of the empire were Lisieux, Cahors, Chalon-sur-Saône, Léon, Dol and Vabres whose bishops were also counts. Ajaccio was Count of Frasso. The bishops of Sarlat, Saint-Malo (Baron de Beignon) and of Luçon were Barons and Tulle was Viscount of the city. The bishop of Mende was governor and count, Puy held the title Count of Velay, Quimper was Seigneur of the city and Comte de Cornouailles, Valence was Seigneur and Count of the city. Montpellier's bishop was Count of Mauguio and Montferrand, Marquis of Marquerose and Baron of Sauve, Durfort, Salevoise, and Brissac. The bishop of Saint-Claude was Seigneur of all the lands of Saint-Claude. The bishops of Digne (Seigneur and Baron), Pamiers (co-Seigneur), Albi, Lectoure, Saint-Brieuc, Saint-Papoul, Saint-Pons, and Uzès were Seigneurs of the cities.

Portugal 
From 1472 to 1967, the bishop of Coimbra held the comital title of Count of Arganil, being thus called "bishop-count". The use of the comital title declined during the 20th century since Portugal has become a republic and nobility privileges have ceased to be officially recognized, and was ultimately discontinued.

Montenegro 

The bishops of Cetinje, who took as the Prince-Bishops of Montenegro the place of the earlier secular (Grand) Voivodes in 1516, had a unique position of Slavonic, Orthodox prince-bishops of Montenegro under Ottoman suzerainty. It was eventually secularized and became ruled by hereditary princes and ultimately Kings of Montenegro in 1852, as reflected in their styles:
 first  ("Bishop and Ruler of Montenegro and the Highlands")
 from 13 March 1852 (New Style):  ("By the grace of God Prince and Sovereign of Montenegro and the Highlands")
 from 28 August 1910 (New Style):  ("By the grace of God, King and Sovereign of Montenegro")

Contemporary 
The Bishop of Urgell, Catalonia, who no longer has any secular rights in Spain, remains ex officio one of two co-princes of Andorra, along with the French head of state (currently its President)

Modern informal usage 
The term has been used by Episcopalians in North America to describe modern bishops with commanding personalities usually of previous generations. One such individual was Bishop Horace W. B. Donegan of whom Episcopal suffragan bishop Robert E. Terwilliger said "We often say that Bishop Donegan is the last prince bishop of the church because in his graciousness, in his presence, in his total lack of any crisis of identity, we have seen what a bishop is; and we know that it is a kind of royalty in Christ." Anglican Archbishop Robert Duncan expressed his view that the pastoral changes "in the 1970s was a revolution in reaction to those prince bishops - they had all this authority, they had all this power." So systems such as the Commission on Ministry system in the Episcopal Church "was to replace an individual's authority with a committee's authority."

See also 
 Crown-cardinal
 Lord Bishop
 Political Catholicism
 Prince-abbot
 Prince-Provost
 Prince of the Church
 Temporal power

References

Sources and external links 
 Catholic Encyclopaedia passim
 The Prince-Bishop of Münster
 Albert of Buxhoeveden, Prince-Bishop of Livonia
 Heraldica.org - here French peerage
 Westermann,  (in German)
 WorldStatesmen search under each present country

Catholicism in the Middle Ages
History of Catholicism in Germany
Ecclesiastical titles
Heads of state
 
 
Bishops by type
Noble titles
Christianity in the Holy Roman Empire